Lentibacillus salicampi is a moderately halophilic bacterium, the type species of its genus. It is Gram-variable, aerobic, endospore-forming and rod-shaped, with type strain SF-20(T) (= KCCM 41560(T) = JCM 11462(T)).

References

Further reading

External links
LPSN
Type strain of Lentibacillus salicampi at BacDive -  the Bacterial Diversity Metadatabase

Bacillaceae
Bacteria described in 2002
Halophiles